John McCulloch may refer to:

John McCulloch (congressman) (1806–1879), congressman from Pennsylvania
John McCulloch (footballer, born 1896) (1896–?), Scottish footballer
John McCulloch (Scottish footballer), Scottish footballer
John Ramsay McCulloch (1789–1864), Ricardian economist
John McCulloch (MP) (1842–1912), British Member of Parliament for Glasgow St Rollox, 1885–1886
John McCulloch (cricketer) (1894–1915), English cricketer

See also
John McCullough (disambiguation)
John MacCulloch